Offset is a 2006 drama film directed and written by . It was filmed in Bucharest.

Plot
The plot focuses on the lives of the soon to be married Stefan, a German working in Romania for a wealthy and eccentric printing company owner, Nicu Iorga and his soon-to-be bride Brindusa, who is Nicu's secretary. Life seems great for both of them, despite the eminent long affair that Nicu had with Brindusa. All the preparations are made for the wedding, Stefan's family arrives, and the soon-to-be bride and groom buy their wedding attire. A newly arrived German (who was set to replace Stefan at the printing company due to a fight with Nicu) Peter Gross is invited to the wedding after he becomes friends with both Stefan and Brindusa. Nicu, armed with a gun (and accompanied by several henchmen), crashes the wedding ceremony and threatens everyone present, including Stefan's father Ernst and Brindusa's father Mr. Hergehelegiu. He even punches Peter in the nose, after which he shoots himself and is taken to the hospital. At the hospital, Brindusa tells Stefan that he should go to Germany to pursue a better life, revealing to him that she still has feelings for Nicu. Although it is not stated in the movie, it is assumed Nicu survives the gunshot. The film ends with an enraged Stefan asking Peter about his nose just outside the hospital, after which they go down the road.

Cast
Alexandra Maria Lara as Brindusa
 as Stefan
Razvan Vasilescu as Nicu Iorga
Valentin Plătăreanu as Mr. Hergehelegiu
Katharina Thalbach as Stefan's Mother
Manfred Zapatka as Stefan's Father
 as Peter Gross
Andreea Bibiri as Wedding shop sales girl
Friedel Morgenstern

References

External links

 

Romanian drama films
2000s German-language films
2000s Romanian-language films
2006 drama films
2006 films
French drama films
German drama films
Swiss drama films
2006 multilingual films
Romanian multilingual films
French multilingual films
German multilingual films
Swiss multilingual films
2000s French films
2000s German films